Shelu is a city in Karjat Tehsil, Maharashtra, India. It also has a station on the Mumbai Suburban Railway in Raigad district. The station is on the Mumbai - Karjat route after Vangani. Shelu Local Language is Marathi. Shelu Village Total population is 1374 and number of houses are 286. Female Population is 48.7%. Village literacy rate is 71.4% and the Female Literacy rate is 31.7%.

References

Cities and towns in Raigad district